Ramswaroop Sundarlal Koli (born 15 January 1965) is an Indian politician, Social worker and former MP of the 14th Lok Sabha of India. He represents the Bayana constituency of Rajasthan and is a member of the Bharatiya Janata Party (BJP) political party.

Positions helfd 
 2004 - Member of Parliament, Lok Sabha
 2004 - Member of Committee on Human Resource Development
 5 August 2006 - Member of Committee on Human Resource Development
 5 August 2007 to Present - Member of Committee on Human Resource Development

References 

1965 births
Living people
Rajasthani politicians
Bharatiya Janata Party politicians from Rajasthan
India MPs 2004–2009
People from Bharatpur district
Lok Sabha members from Rajasthan
India MPs 2014–2019